Edmund Patrick Jordan, OBE (born 30 March 1948), also known as EJ, is an Irish businessman, television personality and former motorsport team owner. Born in Dublin, Jordan worked first at the Bank of Ireland. He  won the Irish Kart Championship in 1971 and moved to Formula Ford in 1974. He was the founder and owner of Jordan Grand Prix, a Formula One constructor which operated from 1991 to 2005. He was the chief analyst for Formula One coverage on the BBC from 2009 to 2015 before joining Channel 4 after BBC pulled out in 2016. In February 2016, it was announced that Jordan would join Top Gear as a presenter.

Early life
Jordan was born Edmund Patrick Jordan at the Wentworth Nursing Home in Dublin on 30 March 1948, the son of Eileen and Paddy Jordan. He has one, older, sibling Helen. His father was the twin brother of a senior nun, Mother Rectoress of the Irish Sisters of Charity and worked as an accountant for the electricity board. At ten months old, Jordan developed a form of pink disease and his family were advised by doctors to move from Dublin to Bray for "fresh air". His mother Eileen was advised to "take him out of woollens and into cotton during the month of May", advice she opposed, initially. Nevertheless, she conceded and Jordan's condition did gradually improve. During his childhood, Jordan grew up in Dartry, south Dublin and Bray, County Wicklow. He spent most of his time in Bray, where he became close with his Aunt Lilian, having regularly travelled to visit her at the end of the school week. In his childhood, Jordan was known by the nickname "Flash" as his surname rhymed with the name Gordon.

Jordan began his education at Saint Anne's Pre-School in Milltown later spending eleven years at the Synge Street Christian Brothers School, where he and his fellow students would be regularly beaten if they did not study hard. Despite this experience, Jordan found the level of education to be high. While at Synge Street, aged 15, Jordan briefly considered becoming a priest. Having dismissed the priesthood and family pressures to enter dentistry, he ended up taking a six-week accountancy course at the College of Commerce, Dublin, and then began working for the Bank of Ireland as a clerk at their branch in Mullingar. After four years, Jordan moved to the branch in Camden Street, Dublin. During a banking strike in Dublin in 1970, he spent the summer on the island of Jersey, working as an accountant for an electricity company by day and doing bar work in the evenings. During this period, he encountered kart racing for the first time, and had his first (unofficial) races there at St Brelade's Bay.

Career

Motor racing
Upon his return to Dublin, Jordan bought a kart and began racing. He entered the Irish Kart Championship in 1971 and won it.

In 1974 Jordan moved up to Formula Ford, the Irish Formula Ford Championship  and in 1975 to Formula Three, but was forced to sit out the 1976 season after shattering his left leg in a crash at Mallory Park. After his injuries had healed, he switched to Formula Atlantic, won three races in 1977, and won the Irish Formula Atlantic Championship in 1978. Jordan and Stefan Johansson raced in British Formula Three in 1979, under the name "Team Ireland" and, in the same year, Jordan drove in one Formula Two race and did a small amount of testing for McLaren.

Team management
At the end of 1979 and short of money, Jordan founded his first team, Eddie Jordan Racing, which ran drivers David Leslie and David Sears in 1981 at various events in and around Great Britain. In 1982 his primary driver was James Weaver; in 1983 Weaver ran again in European F3 and Jordan hired Martin Brundle, who finished second to Ayrton Senna in British F3. In 1987 the team employed Johnny Herbert, who proceeded to win the British Formula Three Championship.

Jordan also entered a Formula 3000 team, whose first wins came with drivers Herbert and Martin Donnelly in 1988. In 1989 the Jordan F3000 team dominated the season and Jordan driver Jean Alesi won the championship. During 1989, hired Reynard Chief Designer Gary Anderson becoming Donnelly's engineer and overseeing operations of the team eventually joining full-time on 4 February 1990.

Mentor
A host of drivers owe their breaks to Jordan. Drivers who have won Grands Prix who have driven for him include world champions Damon Hill, Nigel Mansell, Michael Schumacher and Ayrton Senna, while Jean Alesi, Rubens Barichello, Thierry Boutsen,  Giancarlo Fisichella, Heinz-Harald Frentzen, Johnny Herbert, Eddie Irvine, Roberto Moreno, Ralf Schumacher, Jarno Trulli, Martin Brundle and John Watson also drove in Jordan cars.

Formula One

Jordan founded Jordan Grand Prix in 1991 with Anderson as Chief Designer. The team quickly gained its respect and punched above their weight on a number of occasions during the season. Jordan gave Michael Schumacher his Formula 1 debut in the team's debut season.  After one race for the team, Schumacher was lured away to rivals Benetton.

In  the team achieved its best ever result when drivers Damon Hill and Ralf Schumacher finished first and second at the Belgian Grand Prix. In , Jordan achieved their F1 zenith when Heinz-Harald Frentzen became a genuine contender for the championship, ultimately finishing third, the best placing ever of a Jordan driver and accumulating two race wins along the way. He was leading the European Grand Prix, but retired because of electrical problems. Had he won the race, Frentzen would have been within a point of the championship lead with two rounds remaining.

Decline and sale
After losing a Honda engine partnership deal to the BAR team in 2002 and numerous difficulties within the team (including a very public row and the sacking of Frentzen before his home GP in 2001), Jordan was forced to switch to expensive Cosworth engines. The added burden of this plus DHL withdrawing their sponsorship and Benson & Hedges toning down their sponsorship soon added up and the lack of funds made his team go from bad to worse in 2003. However, despite this, Jordan delivered an improbable race win in Brazil 2003 courtesy of Giancarlo Fisichella, the first for Fisichella and the last Formula One victory for the Ford Motor Company and the Jordan team. In 2001 Jordan sued Vodafone for allegedly breaking a three-year sponsorship agreement worth $150 million but lost the case creating further setbacks for Team Jordan.

Jordan's steep fall from third in the constructors in 1999 was now out of control. Despite new sponsorship from Trust computers and the addition of "Quick" Nick Heidfeld and a promising young rookie in Timo Glock for 2004, Jordan was in serious trouble. Jordan retained complete ownership of his team until 2004 and his rejections of rumoured approaches for buy outs (most notably from Peugeot and Honda) may have cost the team greater success. Jordan, however, said at the team's final race that they in fact won five times—the fifth being their survival on such small funds.

Team after Jordan
After bankruptcy proceedings in 2018, Force India was liquidated and its former assets sold to the new Racing Point F1 Team, which became Aston Martin for the 2021 F1 season. Aston Martin competes in Formula One and operates out of Jordan's old premises at Silverstone.

Media career
In 2009, Jordan returned to the F1 scene as a pundit for BBC Sport F1 coverage alongside Jake Humphrey (who was later replaced by Suzi Perry) and David Coulthard.

Jordan wrote a monthly column called "This Much I Know" for F1 Racing magazine, until they relaunched with Murray Walker writing instead. Jordan also worked on a TV series called Eddie Jordan's Bad Boy Racers. In 2007 he was appointed Chairman of Rally Ireland, a round of the World Rally Championship.

Jordan has broken many stories before they were due to be confirmed; these include Lewis Hamilton's move to Mercedes, Michael Schumacher's return in 2010 and Felipe Massa's departure from Ferrari.

On 11 February 2016 it was announced that he would be one of the new presenters for Top Gear. In March 2016 he was announced as Channel 4's lead analyst for C4F1 .

Bernie Ecclestone interviews
Jordan has had a long time friendship with Bernie Ecclestone and has interviewed him several times. Jordan has spoken many times about how Ecclestone influenced his career.

Other interests

Jordan loves rock and roll music, and he plays the drums. Until 2007, his band's name was V10. A cut-down version of the band is currently gigging at various venues around the world under the name of "Eddie & The Robbers". Jordan is a fan of Celtic, Coventry City and Chelsea and has been linked with takeover bids for Coventry. Jordan is also a Celtic shareholder. Jordan's other sporting interests include golf and horse racing; he has horses in training with Mouse Morris.

Jordan is a keen cyclist in Monaco and South Africa and cycles in the Cape Town Cycle Tour (formerly the Argus) annually in Cape Town.

Jordan has been a keen sailor and boating enthusiast for much of his life.  He circumnavigated the world in 2015.
In 2014, Jordan took delivery of the largest Sunseeker Yacht ever built, reportedly for a price tag of £32m.  Jordan's current yacht is a 45.3m sailing boat called Blush.

Jordan is a keen supporter of Irish art and boasts a wide collection that include Louis le Brocquy, Felim Egan and Markey Robinson among others.

Business interests and entrepreneurship
Jordan has or has had considerable business interests in oil, motor racing, sports, property, gaming, entertainment, and the health and fitness industries.

He was a shareholder in Celtic Football Club. He is an investor in Kinmont Advisory (a corporate advisory business) and a partner in hedge fund, Clareville Capital (founded by David Yarrow).

In 2018, Jordan assisted in the successful bid by his long time friend Richard Hadidas to acquire Oyster Yachts. Jordan served as a director on the board until 2021, when he then became the brand ambassador for the luxury yacht builder.

Jordan has also invested in property, both commercial real estate (which included Bunbury Holdings), as well as residential developments and investments. He also owns land which houses a PGA golf course, and has also invested in a land bank in Bulgaria, for which Norman Forster designed a resort.

Jordan has been long-time friends with Dermot Desmond and Denis O'Brien, who were early supporters of Jordan F1. He has had several investments alongside them since. In 2021, he founded JKO Capital to invest in gaming and entertainment businesses.

In July 2021, Jordan was linked with a $1bn bid to buy the OpenBet business from Scientific Games. Jordan is a long time investor in the gaming space, with investments in Entain, Scientific Games and Evolution, among others.

In November 2021, it emerged that Jordan and Keith O'Loughlin were behind a bid by JKO to acquire Playtech PLC for a rumoured £3 billion. In January 2022, JKO signalled they would not proceed with a formal offer for the company.

Jordan has also been Citi Private Bank's advisory board.

He has business interests that include Ready Room (South Africa), Tosca, Valeo Foods, Jarvis Hotels, Debrett's, Zwift, Apex, Coople (Recruitment) and Docplanner, Spring Studios, George & Dragon (a PR and Marketing agency) and Ceiba (a healthcare tech company). In the past, he has also had his own vodka brand 'Vodka V10' and the energy drink brand 'EJ-10' and Bulgarian property company Madara Capital, that develop Karadere beach. He is an advisor to Aspinall Capital Partners.

Jordan published an autobiography, "An Independent Man", in May 2007.

Charity work
Jordan is a patron of the child cancer charity CLIC Sargent., and is now a patron Amber Foundation. His OBE was awarded for his charity work related to CLIC which raised £11 million over three years and built houses UCLH so parents can be with children when ill.

Personal life
He is married to Marie (née McCarthy), a former Ireland  basketball player. The couple have been married since 1979 and have four children: Zoe, Miki, Zak & Kyle.  They have homes in Cape Town, South Kensington, London and Monaco, where he keeps his yacht.

He was the subject of This Is Your Life in 2000 when he was surprised by Michael Aspel.

Honours 
Jordan has received honorary doctorates from the University of Ulster and Dublin Institute of Technology.

He has received the James Joyce Award from the Literary and Historical Society of University College Dublin, one of the largest student societies in Ireland, to honour his contribution to motorsport in Ireland. He also received the Gold Medal of Honorary Patronage of the University Philosophical Society of Trinity College, Dublin to honour his contribution to motor racing and his charity work over the years. Despite being Irish, Jordan is also a member of the British Racing Drivers' Club due to a grandfather clause  that anyone born in Ireland before 1950 would be considered eligible for membership.

In March 2012, Jordan received an honorary OBE for services to charity and motor racing.

In September 2021, Jordan received the Freedom of the City of London.

References

External links 

1948 births
Living people
Irish motorsport people
Irish racing drivers
24 Hours of Le Mans drivers
Formula One team owners
Formula One team principals
Porsche Supercup drivers
People from Bray, County Wicklow
Sportspeople from County Wicklow
World Sportscar Championship drivers
BBC sports presenters and reporters
Honorary Officers of the Order of the British Empire
Conservative Party (UK) people
Top Gear people
People educated at Synge Street CBS